Grossmont Center is an outdoor shopping mall in La Mesa, California, a suburb in East County, San Diego. The mall opened in 1961 and is managed by Federal Realty Investment Trust. The anchor stores are Target, Macy's, RH Outlet, Walmart, Barnes & Noble, and Reading Cinemas.

History
The mall was built in 1961 by Del E. Webb Construction Company, with Welton Becket and associates as architect. It occupied  of land and cost over $20 million to build. At the time, it was the largest development in La Mesa's history.

Marston's (later The Broadway) and Montgomery Ward were the original two anchor stores. Marston's, which had a location in downtown San Diego, had begun consultations in 1956 to choose the site of the Grossmont Center store, their first branch location. The store design featured  of moldings, gold leaf lettering, murals painted by five artists, and a Gothic-style canopy over its entry. Other major tenants included Longs Drugs, a barbershop, several shoe stores, a florist, a fabric shop, a jeweler, and two dime stores: S. H. Kress & Co. and F. W. Woolworth Company.

Fifty thousand people attended the mall's opening ceremonies on October 5, 1961 – 20,000 more than the population of La Mesa at the time. Present at opening ceremonies were the regional manager of the Montgomery Ward chain; June Wilkinson, a Playboy model; and several representatives of the Marston's chain.

By 1965, a 1,000 seat movie theater had been added to the mall. Buffum's was added in 1979 as a third anchor store in a newly constructed wing, and Bullock's in 1983 as a fourth. Also at this point, a parking deck was added to the mall. Buffum's closed in 1990, with Bullock's and Woolworth following in 1993, although Cost Plus World Market and a food court were added. The former Buffum's became Oshman's SuperSports USA (later bought out by Sports Authority) in 1991, while Target opened in the vacated Bullock's store in 1995.

See's Candies is an original store at Grossmont Center which stands in the same place and is still doing business.

In 1992, the mall's movie theater complex closed, but it was reopened and expanded on May 26, 1995. Barnes & Noble Booksellers was also added on November 24, 1997, replacing Woolworth which closed in 1993. The Broadway chain was bought out by, and changed into a Macy's a year later. Montgomery Ward closed in 2000 and was replaced by Walmart four years later in 2004. In 2016 Sports Authority closed after the chain filed for bankruptcy. The store was re-tenanted in September 2016 by a Restoration Hardware outlet.

In 2021 Federal Realty, a publicly traded real estate investment trust, purchased a majority interest in the center, which had been owned and operated for decades by one family. Reportedly 99 percent of the retail space was occupied at the time of the sale. Federal Realty is considering options for major redevelopment in 2025, when they will have full control of the space.

References

External links
Grossmont Center

Shopping malls in San Diego County, California
La Mesa, California
Shopping malls established in 1961
1961 establishments in California
Welton Becket buildings